Bácsszentgyörgy is a border village and municipality in Bács-Kiskun county, in the Southern Great Plain region of southern Hungary towards Serbia.

Geography

References

External links

Geography of Bács-Kiskun County
Populated places in Bács-Kiskun County